Save China's Tigers (SCT) is an international charitable foundation based in Hong Kong, the United States, and the United Kingdom (Office in London) which aims to save the big cats of China from extinction. It focuses on the Chinese tigers (South China tigers). It also has branches in Mainland China and South Africa.

Aims

According to Save China's Tigers the organization's vision is to raise awareness of the plight of the Chinese tiger and to strive for its protection and preservation through public education, introduction and experimentation with advanced conservation models in China and abroad, and raising funds to support these initiatives. Another aim is to act as a liaison for all those organizations concerned with the conservation of China's wildlife, sustainable development, biodiversity and habitat. According to Save China's Tigers the organizations goal is to reverse the fate of the South China tiger from the brink of extinction by taking them out of zoos, breeding them, letting them regain their hunting abilities, and reintroducing them back to China's wild.

History
"Save China's Tigers" was founded in 2000 by Li Quan. Stuart Bray, her then-husband and a former executive at Deutsche Bank, helped fund the nascent enterprise.

Rewilding

Origin
The word "rewilding" was coined by conservationist and activist Dave Foreman, first occurring in print in 1990. The concept was further defined and expanded by conservation biologists Michael Soulé and Reed Noss in a paper published in 1998. According to Soulé and Noss, rewilding is a conservation method based on "cores, corridors, and carnivores."

The rewilding process

In order to be successfully reintroduced into a wild environment, tigers must know how to hunt prey and have to be able to defend themselves. Once in captivity, an animal will gradually lose its ability to survive in the wild, and will likely die if released. Thus Save China's Tigers started a rehabilitation programme to help captive tigers regain their survival skills. Rehabilitation steps taken by the project include feeding the tigers with carcasses of small game. Once the tigers are eating the new food items, live animals similar to those taken dead will be occasionally introduced into large hunting camps. The SPCA claimed that this process was cruel to the prey, but the South African courts refused to issue an interdict.

The Laohu Valley Reserve

The Laohu Valley Reserve (LVR) is a roughly 350 square kilometer private reserve near Philippolis in the Free State. It has been created with the aims of rewilding captive-born South China tigers and for South African biodiversity conservation in general.  LVR was created in 2002 out of 17 defunct sheep farms, and efforts to return the overgrazed land to natural status are ongoing.  The South China tigers at LVR for rewilding are kept confined to a tiger-proof camp complex of roughly 1.8 square kilometers, with other areas of the reserve being used to protect native South African species.  The word "laohu" is a Chinese term for tiger.

The tigers involved
In April 2014 Madonna gave birth to three cubs, two females and one male. The father of the cubs is Tigerwoods.

Recently on 20 November 2015, two new South China tiger cubs have been born at Laohu Valley. The mother is Cathay and the father is King Henry. With the birth of these cubs, 20 South China tigers in total are in the care of Save China's Tigers within the Laohu Valley Reserve – more than 20% of the world population of the world's most critically endangered tiger. However, a year later in February 2016, one of two South China tiger cubs recently born in late 2015 died, leaving 19 South China tigers in the reserve.

Obstacles

A large difficulty faced by the project is the limited gene pool for South China tigers – all of the South China tigers in Chinese zoos are descended from only 6 individuals caught in the 1950s.

The WWF says that the money is being spent in the wrong place and that the Amur tiger has a better chance of survival.

Controversies 
Li accused her former husband, Stuart Bray, of using charitable funds for personal expenses. This was reported in the Daily Mail, which damaged the charity's reputation with the general public. However, Stuart Bray was acquitted of misappropriation of charitable funds in a court case decision in October 2014.

See also
List of non-governmental organizations in the People's Republic of China
Project Tiger, a similar tiger conservation program in India

References

External links
 Save China's Tiger homepage, information regarding the rewilding project
 A video of the rare South China tiger hunting, the tigress in this video is Cathay from the Save China's Tiger re-wilding project
 A video of a South China tiger named Hope tackling a blesbuck
 Keystone Progress of the Save China's tiger project
 Weekly Tiger Diaries, updated information of the South China tigers posted every week

Charities based in Hong Kong
International environmental organizations
History of South Africa
Conservation projects
Cat conservation organizations
Animal welfare organisations based in Hong Kong